Nadiya Volodymyrivna Tkachenko or Nadezhda Vladimirovna Tkachenko (born 19 September 1948) is a Ukrainian former pentathlete who won gold at the 1980 Olympics. She was born in Kremenchuk, then in the Ukrainian SSR in the Soviet Union, and took up pentathlon aged 18 training at the Vanguard Voluntary Sports Societies of the Soviet Union in Donetsk Oblast. She came second in pentathlon in the Soviet championships of 1971 and 1972, and competed three times for the Soviet Union at the Olympics.

She set her first world record (4839 points) winning the 1977 European Cup.  She won the 1974 European title, but was stripped of the 1978 title after testing positive for anabolic steroids and given an 18-month ban. In May 1980, just after the ban, she scored 4880 points, which was not ratified as a record because the races were hand timed. In July she won the 1980 Olympic title with 5083 points,  becoming the only woman ever to break 5000 points outdoors, with the final world record before the event was replaced in 1981 by the heptathlon.  The Soviet government awarded her the Order of the Red Banner of Labour and the title Honored Master of Sports of the USSR.

Since retiring from competition she has worked as a youth sports coach in Donetsk, of which she was named an honorary citizen in 2005. A youth athletics competition in the city is named after her.

Footnote

References

1948 births
Living people
People from Kremenchuk
Soviet pentathletes
Soviet female athletes
Ukrainian female athletes
Olympic athletes of the Soviet Union
Olympic gold medalists for the Soviet Union
Athletes (track and field) at the 1972 Summer Olympics
Athletes (track and field) at the 1976 Summer Olympics
Athletes (track and field) at the 1980 Summer Olympics
Medalists at the 1980 Summer Olympics
European Athletics Championships medalists
Ukrainian sportspeople in doping cases
Soviet sportspeople in doping cases
Doping cases in athletics
Honoured Masters of Sport of the USSR
Ukrainian pentathletes
Olympic gold medalists in athletics (track and field)
Universiade medalists in athletics (track and field)
Universiade gold medalists for the Soviet Union
Medalists at the 1973 Summer Universiade
Sportspeople from Poltava Oblast